Sudip Bandyopadhyay (born 10 December 1952) is an  Indian politician and a Member of Parliament from Kolkata Uttar Constituency of West Bengal,India. Sudip Bandyopadhyay has been a member of the Lok Sabha for five terms, serving in the  12th,  13th, 15th, 16th, 17th Lok Sabhas. He represents the Kolkata Uttar constituency of West Bengal and is a member of the Trinamool Congress political party. He is the Leader of the Lok Sabha of the All India Trinamool Congress Party.

Political career 

On 3 January 2017, Bandyopadhyay was arrested after interrogation by the Central Bureau of Investigation (CBI) for his non co-operation in ongoing investigation and alleged involvement in the Ponzi firm Rose Valley Group.

Posts held

See also

12th, 13th & 15th Lok Sabha
Lok Sabha
Politics of India
Parliament of India
Government of India
All India Trinamool Congress
West Bengal

References

India MPs 1998–1999
India MPs 1999–2004
India MPs 2009–2014
Trinamool Congress politicians from West Bengal
1952 births
Living people
University of Calcutta alumni
Lok Sabha members from West Bengal
Politicians from Kolkata
India MPs 2014–2019
People from Kolkata district
India MPs 2019–present
West Bengal MLAs 1987–1991
West Bengal MLAs 1991–1996
West Bengal MLAs 1996–2001
Indian National Congress politicians from West Bengal
Krishnath College alumni